Ruslan Koryan (born 15 June 1988) is an Armenian former professional footballer who played as either a striker or attacking midfielder.

Career

Club
He is alumnus of a specialized school of olympic reserve after Sergey Bubka in Donetsk. In 2005, he signed his first contract with Olimpik Donetsk. Koryan played 2006–2007 for Dynamo-3 Kyiv. In February 2015 he moved to Lokomotiv Tashkent.

On 8 March 2015, he scored his first official goal for Lokomotiv in Supercup match against Pakhtakor on 55 minute by penalty, ended with scoreline 4:0.

On 2 July 2019, Koryan left FC Istiklol by mutual consent.

On 9 September 2020, Koryan signed for FC Kyzylzhar.

International
He was called up in Armenia national team for the first time on 9 March 2015 for UEFA Euro 2016 qualifying match against Albania. He played his debut match on 9 March 2015 against Albania as substitute for Artur Yedigaryan on 84 minute.

Personal life
Koryan is the cousin of the Russian youth international Arshak Koryan.

Career statistics

Club

International goals
Scores and results list Armenia's goal tally first.

Honours

Club
Luch-Energiya
 Russian PFL, East conference (1) 2012-13
 Russian NFL Cup: 2014

Lokomotiv
 Uzbekistan Super Cup (1): 2014

Istiklol
Tajik Supercup (1): 2019

Notes

References

External links
 Profile by FNL
 
 
 

1988 births
Living people
Sportspeople from Sochi
Armenian footballers
Association football forwards
Armenia international footballers
Russian footballers
FC Mordovia Saransk players
FC Luch Vladivostok players
FC SKA Rostov-on-Don players
FC SKA-Khabarovsk players
FC Fakel Voronezh players
FC Pyunik players
FC Istiklol players
Russian people of Armenian descent
Russian Premier League players
Armenian Premier League players
Expatriate footballers in Tajikistan
Tajikistan Higher League players